Rhian Joel Brewster (born 1 April 2000) is an English professional footballer who plays as a striker for  club Sheffield United and the England national under-21 team. In 2017, he was part of the England squad which won the 2017 FIFA U-17 World Cup in India and was awarded the Golden Boot award for ending as the competition's leading goalscorer.

Club career

Early career
Brewster was born in Chadwell Heath, Greater London, to a Barbadian father and Turkish Cypriot mother. Brewster attended school at Chadwell Primary School before joining the Chadwell Heath and Shield Academy YFC. At the age of seven, he was scouted by representatives from Chelsea, Arsenal, West Ham United and Charlton Athletic. He ultimately joined Chelsea where he developed his game under coach Michael Beale in the club's academy until the age of 14, whereafter he left to join Premier League rivals Liverpool.

Liverpool
In 2015, Liverpool signed Brewster from Chelsea following a recommendation by Beale who had taken up a position with the club. Brewster's decision to make the move was motivated in part by his father's influence who believed that he had a better chance of breaking through to the first team through Liverpool's academy than Chelsea's. He initially joined the club's U18 team before being promoted to the U23 squad, where he scored on his debut against Ipswich Town. During his time with the club's academy, Brewster was placed on a special training regime which included one-on-one sessions with former Liverpool and Real Madrid winger, Steve McManaman.

Brewster was then called up by manager Jürgen Klopp to the first-team for club friendlies in October and November 2016 during which he scored a hat-trick against Accrington Stanley. Later that season, he was named on the bench for Liverpool's Premier League game against Crystal Palace on 23 April 2017, but remained an unused substitute. The following season, during Liverpool's UEFA Youth League match against Spartak Moscow, Brewster was the victim of alleged racist comments from Spartak's captain, Leonid Mironov. An investigation into the incident was opened by UEFA after the match and Brewster later said in an interview with The Guardian that it had been the seventh such instance he had experienced, including once before against the same opposition. UEFA later ruled that there was insufficient evidence to take further action against Mironov.

On 12 January 2018, during an U23 match against Manchester City, Brewster received oxygen and had to be stretchered off the field after landing awkwardly following an aerial challenge. He was later diagnosed with a high ankle sprain and related ligament damage and was ruled out for the remainder of the season. In March, he had to undergo a second operation in order to repair damage to his knee which he sustained during the same incident.
Towards the end of the season, Brewster was the subject of intense transfer speculation which culminated in Liverpool cancelling a scheduled friendly against Borussia Mönchengladbach after the German club were alleged to have 'tapped him up'.

In June 2018, Brewster signed a five-year professional contract with Liverpool. He was named in the match squad for the second leg of Liverpool's 2018–19 Champions League semi-final against Barcelona on 7 May 2019, but remained an unused substitute. Despite never having played in a competitive game for the club, Brewster was on the bench again in the 2019 UEFA Champions League Final against Tottenham Hotspur on 1 June 2019 so collected a winner's medal as Liverpool won 2–0.

He made his competitive debut for the club on 25 September 2019 in an EFL Cup match against Milton Keynes Dons.

Loan to Swansea City
On 7 January 2020, Brewster joined Championship club Swansea City on loan for the remainder of the season, where he reunited with former England U17 manager Steve Cooper. He made his debut for the club in the South Wales derby against Cardiff City on 12 January, which ended in a goalless draw, before scoring his first professional goal in a 2–1 win over Wigan Athletic at the Liberty Stadium six days later.

In March 2020, the Championship season was temporarily suspended due to the outbreak of the Coronavirus disease. Following the season's restart in June, Brewster scored two goals in a 3–0 win over Middlesbrough, increasing his tally to six goals in 12 games. Brewster finished the season with 11 goals in 22 appearances.

Return to Liverpool
Brewster returned to Liverpool following his loan spell at Swansea to begin preseason training prior to the beginning of the 2020–21 Premier League campaign. He appeared as a substitute in the 2020 FA Community Shield. The game ended 1–1 and went to penalties, with Brewster hitting the crossbar on his attempt, leading to Arsenal winning the shootout and lifting the trophy.

Sheffield United
On 2 October 2020, Sheffield United announced the signing of Brewster from Liverpool on a five-year deal, for a reported fee of around £23.5 million. The deal includes a buy-back option at £40 million, valid until 30 June 2023. 

He scored his first goal for the club in an EFL Cup tie against Carlisle United on 10 August 2021.
On 6 November 2021, Brewster scored his first league goal for Sheffield United in a 3–1 loss away against Blackburn Rovers.

International career
An England youth international, Brewster has represented the nation at various youth levels, but remains eligible to play for Turkey through his Turkish Cypriot mother and Barbados through his Barbadian father.

Having previously represented England at U16 level, Brewster scored six goals in five appearances for England U17 in 2016, including a hat-trick against Croatia and a brace against Germany. He then led the nation's attack at 2017 UEFA European Under-17 Championship and featured in the final against Spain. England ultimately lost on penalties with Brewster one of the players who missed his spot-kick. He ended the tournament with a return of three goals in six appearances.

Later that year, Brewster gained widespread press attention  after scoring successive hat-tricks against the United States and Brazil in the quarter-final and semi-finals of the 2017 FIFA U-17 World Cup. He then scored England's opening goal in the final as the team overcame Spain 5–2 to claim the trophy. Brewster's return of eight goals for the tournament saw him win the Golden Boot award for the top scorer and he was also awarded the Bronze Ball for his individual performances. In December 2017, Brewster revealed in an interview with The Guardian that his teammate Morgan Gibbs-White was racially abused by a Spanish player during the match with the FA reporting the incident to FIFA.

On 30 August 2019, Brewster was included in the England U21 squad for the first time  and made his debut as a 79th minute substitute during the 3–2 2021 U21 Euro qualifying win against Turkey on 6 September 2019. 

On 7 September 2021, Brewster scored his first U21 goal from the penalty spot during the 2–0 2023 UEFA European Under-21 Championship qualification win over Kosovo U21s at Stadium MK.

Personal life
In June 2022, Brewster and Sheffield United teammate Oli McBurnie were charged with common assault by Nottinghamshire Police "in relation to disorder at the conclusion of a game at the City Ground on 17 May 2022". Both players "strenuously denied" the allegations. The charges against Brewster were dropped in July 2022.

In October 2022, Brewster was subjected to racial abuse on Instagram for a second time having received similar messages in March 2021.

Career statistics

Honours
Liverpool
UEFA Champions League: 2018–19
UEFA Super Cup: 2019
FA Community Shield runner-up: 2020

England U17
FIFA U-17 World Cup: 2017
UEFA European Under-17 Championship runner-up: 2017

Individual
FIFA U-17 World Cup Golden Boot: 2017
FIFA U-17 World Cup Bronze Ball: 2017

References

External links

Profile at the Sheffield United F.C. website

2000 births
Living people
People from Chadwell Heath
Footballers from the London Borough of Barking and Dagenham
Footballers from the London Borough of Redbridge
English footballers
Association football forwards
Chelsea F.C. players
Liverpool F.C. players
Swansea City A.F.C. players
Sheffield United F.C. players
English Football League players
Premier League players
UEFA Champions League winning players
England youth international footballers
England under-21 international footballers
Black British sportsmen
English people of Barbadian descent
English people of Turkish Cypriot descent
Sportspeople of Turkish Cypriot descent